5th Nasr Division (or lashkar-5-Nasr) is one of the Divisions of Islamic Revolutionary Guard Corps. It is also known as the Sepah-e Nsar Corps.

Formation and the Iran–Iraq War
The unit was formed from troops of Khorasan province in 1982 during the Iran–Iraq War before the preliminary moves of Operation Dawn. Its first commander was Hassan Bagheri Afshardi. Hassan Bagheri was in charge of the division for only 10 days before being killed in action. At the start of 1983, under the command of Morteza Ghorbani, the division took part in the capture of Mehran during Operation Dawn-3. The division went on to take part in Operations Badr, Memak, Dawn-8, Karbala 4 and Karbala 5. Commanders during this time included Esmail Qaani and Mohammad Bagher Qalibaf.

Subsequent history
After the Iran–Iraq War, the unit was based in Mashhad, near the border with Afghanistan. Alongside the Hekmatyar network, under the leadership of Brigadier Gholamreza Baghban the division played a role in the exfiltration of Osama Bin Laden's fighters and family from Afghanistan in the aftermath of the US invasion of Afghanistan in 2001.

Former commanders
 Mohammad Bagher Qalibaf

References

Military units and formations of Army of the Guardians of the Islamic Revolution
Divisions of Iran